The Bruce Perens' Open Source Series was a series of books edited by Bruce Perens as series editor and published by Prentice Hall PTR.  Principal topics were Linux and other open-source software. These books were intended for professional software developers, system and network administrators, and power users.

The series was published between 2002 and 2006; there were 24 titles in the series.

Each book was licensed under the Open Publication License and was made available as a free download several months after publication. It was the first book series to be published under an open content license.

References

Books about free software

Series of books
Books about Linux
System administration
Open Publication License-licensed works
Open content